The Hasdeo Thermal Power Station or Korba West Thermal Power Station is an 840 megawatt (MW) coal-fired power station at Korba in Chhattisgarh, India. The power station is owned and operated by Chhattisgarh State Power Generation Company, a publicly owned generation utility formed in 2009 following the restructuring of the Chhattisgarh State Electricity Board.

Capacity
The 840 MW power station comprises four units of 210 MW each:

References

Coal-fired power stations in Chhattisgarh
Korba district
Energy infrastructure completed in 1983
1983 establishments in Madhya Pradesh